The 2021 season was the Western Bulldogs's fifth season in the AFL Women's (AFLW) competition. Nathan Burke was the team's coach for the second consecutive season, and Ellie Blackburn was the team's captain for the third consecutive season. The Western Bulldogs finished the home-and-away season eighth on the ladder and with a win–loss record of 5–4, meaning they missed out on qualifying for finals.

Ellie Blackburn was the Western Bulldogs' best and fairest player, winning the Western Bulldogs best and fairest award for the second time in her career. Isabel Huntington, who kicked 12 goals, was the club's leading goal-kicker for the first time in her career. Blackburn was also selected in the all-Australian team. Eleanor Brown and Kirsty Lamb were other standout players for the Bulldogs that season.

Background

The Western Bulldogs are an Australian rules football team based in Melbourne, Victoria, that competes in the AFL Women's. They ended the 2020 home-and-away season seventh in conference B, with a win-loss record of just 1–5. Their previous season ended after they failed to qualify for the finals series.

In the off season, Ellie Blackburn was named captain of the Western Bulldogs for the third year in a row. Brooke Lochland was named as the vice-captain. The leadership group was composed of Isabel Huntington, Ashleigh Guest, Kirsty Lamb, Bailey Hunt and Bonnie Toogood. Nathan Burke was named as head coach for a second season, Marcus Abney-Hastings joined the coaching panel as an assistant coach. They also retained line coaches Jack Fitzpatrick and Natalie Wood, and brought in Andrew Shakespeare as a skill acquisition coach. The team broke their AFLW membership record for the 2021 season, gaining a total of 2,177 members.

Playing list

2020 off-season list changes

After the conclusion of the 2020 AFL Women's season, the  did not delist any players. The club also heavily hit the draft after a rather unsuccessful season, drafting Northern Knights midfielder Jess Fitzgerald at pick 2, Sandringham Dragons defender Sarah Hartwig at pick 11, and Western Jets utility Isabelle Pritchard at pick 16. Annabelle Strahan was brought in as a replacement player for Katy Herron, who was placed on the inactive list.

Season summary
Before the beginning of the 2021 AFLW season, it was decided that the conference ladder system would be scrapped in favour of all teams being placed on the same ladder. While an initial fixture was released in December 2020, the effects of the COVID-19 pandemic meant that the fixture was reshuffled multiple times in order to meet the restrictions of individual states.

The Western Bulldogs began their season with a 9-point loss to second-year expansion club , playing in a prime time fixture slot on a Friday night. Inaccurate kicking saw them down 13 point at half time, despite having more scoring shots. After being down just tw points late in the final quarter, the Saints kicked the final goal of the match to win the game by 9 points. Although she was on the losing team, captain Ellie Blackburn secured the three Best and fairest votes for that game after kicking 2 goals and collecting 21 disposals. Isabel Huntington and Bonnie Toogood also kicked 2 goals apiece.

A crowd of 3,479 people attended the game, a season high. The game was very close throughout all four quarters, the margin never being more than 15 points. The first term kept the Bulldogs goalless, after a shocking missed shot by Kirsten McLeod from inside the goalsquare kept them from scoring more than 4 points. However, things improved from there, with Isabel Huntington and Jess Fitzgerald goalling each to keep the Bulldogs in the game. After being down 10 points at 3 quarter time, Ellie Blackburn and Kirsten McLeod kicked 3 goals between them to give the team an 8-point lead. Carlton had the chance to win the game but missed two crucial set shots, giving the Bulldogs victory. Blackburn once again secured the three best and fairest votes after kicking 2 final quarter goals and collecting 22 disposals.

The Bulldogs managed to secure their second win in a row after coming up against the low-placed  in a low scoring affair, with the combined total of both teams' scores only reaching 33 points. The Bulldogs suffered from inaccuracy woes, at one point totalling a score of 1.6 (12) before kicking 2 final quarter goals through Fitzgerald and McLeod to win the game. Fitzgerald's goal was nominated

Results

Statistics
The team used 28 players from the 31 on the playing list, of which four were debutants. Those debutants were Jess Fitzgerald and Sarah Hartwig (round 1), Isabella Grant (round 3) and Isabelle Pritchard (round 6).

Ladder
<onlyinclude>

Awards
The Western Bulldogs held their AFLW awards night on 24 April 2021. Captain Ellie Blackburn won the Best and Fairest award with 72 votes. Kirsty Lamb polled 63 votes to finish in second place, while Isabel Huntington, Eleanor Brown and Bonnie Toogood rounded out the top 5 with 51, 42 and 39 votes respectively.

Best and Fairest Ellie Blackburn and 2020 Rising Star winner Isabel Huntington were selected in the initial All-Australian squad of 40. While Huntington was not selected in the final squad, Blackburn achieved selection on the half forward flank. Blackburn was also awarded the Best Captain Award by the AFL Players Association, overcoming  captain Daisy Pearce and eventual league best and fairest Brianna Davey. Kirsty Lamb was nominated for the Most Courageous Player Award, but lost out to four-time winner Chelsea Randall. First-year player Jess Fitzgerald was also one of the three final nominees for the Goal of the Year award, but lost to  young gun Courtney Hodder.

See also
 2021 Western Bulldogs season

References

External links
 Official website of the Western Bulldogs
 Official website of the AFL Women's

Western Bulldogs seasons
2021 AFL Women's season